Pamela Joan Boyd-Petroski (born September 27, 1955) is an American former handball player who competed in the 1984 Summer Olympics.

Boyd graduated in 1974 from Central Regional High School, where she played both basketball and field hockey. She was inducted into the school's  Golden Eagles Athletics Hall of Fame in 2012.

Boyd now teaches physical education at Pinelands Regional High School in Tuckerton, New Jersey.

References

1955 births
Living people
Central Regional High School alumni
American female handball players
Olympic handball players of the United States
Handball players at the 1984 Summer Olympics
Sportspeople from Ocean County, New Jersey
Sportspeople from Atlantic City, New Jersey
21st-century American women